Hunter Township is a township in Jackson County, Minnesota, United States. The population was 258 at the 2000 census.

Hunter Township was organized in 1872, and named for James Wilson Hunter, a county official.

Geography

Demographics
As of the census of 2000, there were 258 people, 99 households, and 77 families residing in the township.  The population density was 7.2 people per square mile (2.8/km2).  There were 113 housing units at an average density of 3.2/sq mi (1.2/km2).  The racial makeup of the township was 100.00% White. Hispanic or Latino of any race were 0.78% of the population.

There were 99 households, out of which 30.3% had children under the age of 18 living with them, 71.7% were married couples living together, 4.0% had a female householder with no husband present, and 22.2% were non-families. 20.2% of all households were made up of individuals, and 12.1% had someone living alone who was 65 years of age or older.  The average household size was 2.61 and the average family size was 3.00.

In the township the population was spread out, with 27.1% under the age of 18, 3.9% from 18 to 24, 23.6% from 25 to 44, 20.9% from 45 to 64, and 24.4% who were 65 years of age or older.  The median age was 42 years. For every 100 females, there were 106.4 males.  For every 100 females age 18 and over, there were 106.6 males.

The median income for a household in the township was $41,786, and the median income for a family was $46,667. Males had a median income of $33,333 versus $26,000 for females. The per capita income for the township was $18,729.  About 3.9% of families and 3.2% of the population were below the poverty line, including 4.6% of those under the age of eighteen and none of those 65 or over.

Politics
Hunter Township is located in Minnesota's 1st congressional district, represented by Mankato educator Tim Walz, a Democrat. At the state level, Hunter Township is located in Senate District 22, represented by Republican Doug Magnus, and in House District 22B, represented by Republican Rod Hamilton.

References

Townships in Jackson County, Minnesota
Townships in Minnesota